is a passenger railway station located in the city of Inabe, Mie Prefecture, Japan, operated by the private railway operator Sangi Railway.

Lines
Ohda Station is served by the Hokusei Line, and is located 18.1 kilometres from the terminus of the line at Nishi-Kuwana Station.

Layout
The station consists of a single side platform serving bidirectional traffic. The station is unattended.

Platforms

Adjacent stations

History
Ohda Station was opened on August 6, 1916 as a station of the Hokusei Railway, which became the Hokusei Electric Railway on June 27, 1934. Through a series of mergers, the line became part of the Kintetsu group on April 1, 1965. On April 15, 1977 the station platform was considerably extended, from 35.9 meters to its present 61.0 meters in length. On April 1, 2003 the Sangi Railway was spun out of Kintetsu as an independent company. A new station building was completed in March 2004.

Passenger statistics
In fiscal 2019, the station was used by an average of 134 passengers daily (boarding passengers only).

Surrounding area
Hokusei Yamasato Post Office
Gyojun-ji Temple

See also
List of railway stations in Japan

References

External links

Sangi Railway official home page

Railway stations in Japan opened in 1916
Railway stations in Mie Prefecture
Inabe, Mie